Tyler Green may refer to:
 Tyler Green (baseball) (born 1970), retired baseball pitcher
 Tyler Green (journalist), author, historian, and critic
 Tyler Green (Doctors), a character from the soap opera

See also
 Tyler Greene (born 1983), American shortstop